Global Citizen Year is a non-profit organization based in San Francisco.

History 

Global Citizen Year was founded after Abigail Falik won first place in the 2008 Harvard Business School Pitch for Change with her blueprint for the idea. After graduating from high school, Falik had looked for an opportunity for global service before college but found that the Peace Corps would not accept 18-year-olds and that few similar programs existed for that age group. 

Global Citizen Year designed a Fellowship that uses cultural immersion to equip high school graduates with skills and perspectives that can’t be learned in a classroom For the equivalent of an academic year, Fellows experienced life for the global majority—living with a family in Brazil, Ecuador, India, or Senegal and apprenticing to local efforts advancing education, health and sustainability. 

When the COVID-19 pandemic halted international travel, in 2020, a virtual Academy was launched—bringing the organization's leadership curriculum to more students in more countries.

Recognition 
In 2021 Global Citizen Year was named the #1 place to work in the U.S. by Outside Magazine.

References

Further reading 
 
 
 
 Couric, Katie (2016-09-22), Yahoo! News

External links 
 

Non-profit organizations based in San Francisco
Organizations established in 2008
2008 establishments in California
Ashoka Fellows